VPS29 is a human gene coding for the vacuolar protein sorting protein Vps29, a component of the retromer complex.

Yeast homolog
The homologous protein (one that performs the same function) in yeast is Vacuolar protein sorting 29 homolog (S. cerevisiae).

Function
VPS29 belongs to a group of genes coding for vacuolar protein sorting (VPS) proteins that, when functionally impaired, disrupt the efficient delivery of vacuolar hydrolases. The protein encoded by this gene, Vps29, is a component of a large multimeric complex, termed the retromer complex, which is involved in retrograde transport of proteins from endosomes to the trans-Golgi network. Vps29 may be involved in the formation of the inner shell of the retromer coat for retrograde vesicles leaving the prevacuolar compartment. Alternative splice variants encoding different isoforms, and usage of multiple polyadenylation sites have been found for this gene.

References

Further reading